513th may refer to:

513th Air Control Group, United States Air Force Reserve unit assigned to Tinker AFB, Oklahoma
513th Electronic Warfare Squadron, United States Air Force unit assigned to the 53d Electronic Warfare Group at Eglin Air Force Base, Florida
513th Fighter-Interceptor Squadron, inactive United States Air Force unit
513th Parachute Infantry Regiment (United States) (513th PIR), regiment of the 17th Airborne Division of the United States Army
513th Troop Carrier Group, wing of the United States Air Force assigned to Wright-Patterson Air Force Base, Ohio

See also
513 (number)
513, the year 513 (DXIII) of the Julian calendar
513 BC